Man Wah Sun Chuen is a private housing estate at the junction of Jordan Road and Ferry Street, in Yau Ma Tei, Kowloon, Hong Kong, near the former Jordan Road Ferry Pier (now MTR Austin station).

Formerly the site of the warehouse of Yaumatei Ferry Pier on the reclaimed land of West Jordan, Man Wah Sun Chuen has a total of eight blocks built in 1965 and it is one of the oldest private housing estates in Hong Kong. Its three sides were surrounded by the sea before the West Kowloon Reclamation was completed in the 1990s.

See also 
Ferry Point, Hong Kong
Jordan Road Ferry Pier

References

External links

Private housing estates in Hong Kong
Residential buildings completed in 1965
Yau Ma Tei